Gutnish, or rarely Gutnic ( or ), refers to the original language spoken on parts of the islands of Gotland and Fårö. The different dialects of Gutnish, while stemming from the Old Gutnish variety of Old Norse, are sometimes considered part of modern Swedish. Gutnish exists in two variants, Mainland Gutnish (Storlandsgutamål or Storlandsmål), mostly spoken in the southern and southeastern portion of Gotland, where the dialect of Lau became the standard form on the Main Island (Lau Gutnish → Laumål), and Fårö Gutnish (Gutnish: Faroymal), spoken on the island of Fårö. UNESCO defines Gutnish as a "definitely endangered language" as of 2010.

Some features of Gutnish include the preservation of Old Norse diphthongs like ai in for instance  (English: stone) and  oy in for example  (English: die). There is also a triphthong that exists in no other Norse languages: iau as in / (English: shoot).

Many Gotlanders do not understand Gutnish, and speak Gotlandic, a Gutnish-influenced Swedish dialect.

According to the guild's webpage, there are now 1,500 people using Gutnish on Facebook.

Phonology

Vowels
The contrastive vowels in Modern Gutnish are /ɪ/, /ʏ/, /e/, /œ/, /a/, /ɔ/, /u/.
Of these, all but /u/ have a short and a long version. What is etymologically a long /uː/ has been broken into the sequence [ʉu].

A distinctive feature of Gutnish is the existence of a large number of sequences of vowel plus [ɪ] or [u] which form vocalic phonemes of their own. These
sequences are the following: /eɪ/, /ɛɪ/, /œʏ/, /aɪ/, /ɔɪ/, /ʉu/, /eu/, /au/, /ɔu/.

Some of these sequences alternate with short vowels between different morphological forms of the same lexeme, cf. such pairs as "veit" /vɛɪt̪ʰ/ ‘white’ (f.) ∼
/vɪt̪ʰ:/ ‘white’ (n).

 /e, eː/, when preceding other vowels, /r/, or post-alveolar sounds, have a tendency to be more open [æ, æː].
 In Fårö Gutnish, /a, aː/ are further backed [ɑ, ɑː].
 /ɔ, ɔː/ may be realized as more close [o, oː] when preceding a sonorant.
 /u/ may be [ʊ] when unstressed.

Consonants

 Voiceless stops /p, t̪, k/ may be aspirated [pʰ, t̪ʰ, kʰ].

Lexicon
Gutnish has many words of its own that make it different from Swedish. The following is a small selection of Gutnish's everyday vocabulary:

Status
Gutnish is now under pressured influence of the Swedish standard language, both through speaker contact and through media and (perhaps most importantly) written language. As a result, Gutnish has become much closer to the Swedish standard language. Due to the island's Danish and Hanseatic period there were also influences from Danish and German. There are also many Gotlanders who do not learn the language, but speak a regionally colored variant of the standard Swedish (Gotlandic). This is characterized mainly by its intonation, but also by diphthongs and triphthongs, some lexical peculiarities as well as the infinitive ending -ä.

The Gutamålsgillet association, which has been working for the preservation and revitalization of Gutnish since 1945, estimates that Gutnish is spoken today by 2,000 to 5,000 people. How many are still passive, is not specified. However, an interest in Gutnish seems to be present: From 1989 to 2011, the radio show Gutamål ran in Radio Gotland, which regularly reached about 15,000 to 20,000 listeners, and in 2008 Gotland University offered their first course in Gutnish. Gutamålsgillet collects writings of authors and poets who write their texts in Gutnish, and maintains a Swedish-Gutnish dictionary and an ever-growing list of Gotlandic neologisms.

In 2022, a citizen of the island of Gotland asked to use her surname with the Gutnish ending -dotri (instead of Swedish -dotter). The authority appealed against the positive decision of the administrative court in Stockholm, but in the end, the Court of Appeal ruled that she was allowed to use a Gutnish surname.

Examples

Notes

References

External links 
 Official site of the Modern Gutnish Guild

 
Gotland
North Germanic languages
Endangered Germanic languages
Languages of Sweden
Scandinavian culture
Germanic languages